The 2016 Porsche Carrera Cup Great Britain was a multi-event, one-make motor racing championship held across England and Scotland. The championship featured a mix of professional motor racing teams and privately funded drivers, competing in Porsche 911 GT3 cars that conformed to the technical regulations for the championship. It formed part of the extensive program of support categories built up around the BTCC centrepiece. The 2016 season was the fourteenth Porsche Carrera Cup Great Britain season, commencing on 3 April at Brands Hatch – on the circuit's Indy configuration – and finished on 2 October at the same venue, utilising the Grand Prix circuit, after sixteen races at eight meetings. Fourteen of the races were held in support of the 2016 British Touring Car Championship season, with a round in support of the 2016 FIA World Endurance Championship season.

Entry list

Race calendar and results
The calendar was announced by the championship organisers on 30 November 2015.

Championship standings

Drivers' championships

Overall championship

Pro-Am championships

References

Notes

External links
 

Porsche Carrera Cup
Porsche Carrera Cup Great Britain seasons